Owu Waterfall is a waterfall located in Owa Kajola in Ifelodun Local Government Area of Kwara State, Nigeria. It's the highest waterfall in West Africa measuring 120m above the water level and cascades 330 feet down an escarpment, with rocky out crops to a pool of ice-cold water below.

References

Waterfalls of Nigeria
Kwara State
Tourist attractions in Kwara State